"Maybe" is a song by American rapper Rocko. It was released in June 2010 on Rocko's Rocky Road imprint through Def Jam Recordings, as the lead single from the mixtape Wild Life.
In the United States, "Maybe" peaked at number 15 on Billboards Hot R&B/Hip-Hop Songs chart, and number 52 on the Billboard Hot 100.

References 

2010 singles
Rocko (rapper) songs
2010 songs